The 2021 Korean Series was the championship series of the 2021 KBO League season. All games in the best-of-seven series were held at the Gocheok Sky Dome due to the cold weather. The KT Wiz won the series over the Doosan Bears, 4–0. Park Kyung-su won the Korean Series Most Valuable Player Award.

Summary

Matchups

Game 1

William Cuevas pitched  innings for the KT Wiz in Game 1. With the score tied 1–1 in the seventh inning, Bae Jung-dae hit the go-ahead home run for the Wiz.

Game 2

Kang Baek-ho reached base in eight consecutive plate appearances in Games 1 and 2, tying a Korean Series record.

Game 3

KT Wiz' second baseman Park Kyung-su hit a home run in the fifth inning to start the scoring. Later in the game, he tore a muscle in his right calf, forcing him to miss the remainder of the series.

Game 4

The KT Wiz completed a four-game sweep of the Doosan Bears. Park Kyung-su won the Korean Series Most Valuable Player Award.

See also

2021 Japan Series
2021 World Series
2021 Taiwan Series

References

Korean Series
KT Wiz
Doosan Bears
Korean Series
Korean Series
Korean Series